The 1998 Caribbean Cup (known as the Shell Caribbean Cup for sponsorship reasons) was the tenth edition of the Caribbean Cup hosted by Jamaica and Trinidad and Tobago.

Qualifying tournament

Group 1
Played in Aruba

First round

Group 2
Played in Castries, Saint Lucia

Group 3
Played in Saint Kitts

Group 4
Played in St. John's, Antigua

Group 5
 withdrew

Played in Port-au-Prince, Haiti

Group 6
 withdrew

Played in Cayman Islands

Final tournament

Group stage

Group A - (Trinidad and Tobago)

Group B - (Jamaica)

Semi-finals

3rd Place Playoff

Final

Top scorers
  Stern John (10)

References

rsssf.com

Caribbean Cup
International association football competitions hosted by Trinidad and Tobago
Caribbean Cup
Car
Car
International association football competitions hosted by Jamaica